Ozzy Osbourne (born 1948), is an English singer, songwriter, actor and reality television star.

Ozzy may also refer to:
Ozzy (given name) or Ozzie, masculine name
Ozzy (album), 1996 album by Canadian alternative/indie rock band hHead
Ozzy (film), 2016 computer-animated comedy film

See also
Ozzey, fictional character from Bo' Selecta!